Willett is a ghost town in Harding County, in the U.S. state of South Dakota.

History
A post office called Willett was established in 1909, and remained in operation until 1952. The town was named for the a local family engaged in ranching.

References

https://southdakota.hometownlocator.com/maps/feature-map,ftc,3,fid,1263410,n,willett.cfm

Ghost towns in South Dakota
Geography of Harding County, South Dakota